Newland Road Site, also known as The Nine Foot Brick Road, is a historic archaeological site located near Morgan's Corner, Pasquotank County, North Carolina. The site consists of two remnant portions of a nine-foot wide highway constructed with brick and constructed in 1921–1922.

It was listed on the National Register of Historic Places in 1983.

References

Archaeological sites on the National Register of Historic Places in North Carolina
Buildings and structures in Pasquotank County, North Carolina
National Register of Historic Places in Pasquotank County, North Carolina